India is participating in World Games since inaugural Games of 1981. As of 2022 India has won 5 medals (1 Gold, 1 Silver and 3 Bronze).

Medal count

Medals by sport

Medalists

See also
India at the Olympics
India at the Paralympics
India at the Asian Games
India at the Commonwealth Games
India at the Lusofonia Games
India at the South Asian Games

References 

 
Nations at the World Games